Francis Caldwell CBE MVO KPM (1860 – 17 April 1934) was a British police officer who served as Head Constable of Liverpool City Police from 1912 to 1925.

Caldwell was born in Croxteth to Francis Brown Caldwell, an accountant from Ayrshire, Scotland and James Caldwell from West Derby. He joined the Liverpool police as a clerk in 1879 and rapidly rose through the ranks to First Assistant Head Constable, succeeding Sir Leonard Dunning as Head Constable (the equivalent of Chief Constable in most other British forces) in January 1912.

Caldwell was appointed Member of the Royal Victorian Order 5th Class (MVO) in 1913 and Commander of the Order of the British Empire (CBE) in the 1920 civilian war honours. He was awarded the King's Police Medal (KPM) in the 1919 New Year Honours.

He died at the age of 74.

Footnotes

References
Obituary, The Times, 18 April 1934

1860 births
1934 deaths
Date of birth missing
People from Croxteth
English people of Scottish descent
British Chief Constables
Commanders of the Order of the British Empire
Members of the Royal Victorian Order